Carleton was a federal electoral district in New Brunswick, Canada that was represented in the House of Commons of Canada from 1867 to 1917. It was created in 1867 as part of the British North America Act, and was abolished in 1914 when it was merged into Victoria—Carleton. It was named for Carleton County, New Brunswick.

Members of Parliament
This riding elected the following Members of Parliament:

Election results

By-election on Mr Connell's death, June 28, 1873.

By-election:   On Mr. Connell's death, 15 February 1881

	

By-election:   On election of 1891 being declared void

See also 

 List of Canadian federal electoral districts
 Past Canadian electoral districts

External links
Riding history from the Library of Parliament

Former federal electoral districts of New Brunswick